Wellington Phoenix Football Club is a New Zealand-based professional football club located in Wellington, on the country's North Island. The club was formed in 2007 and played their first competitive match in July 2007 in the 2007 A-League Pre-Season Challenge Cup. The club has played home matches primarily at Sky Stadium. Since playing their first competitive match nearly 150 players have made a competitive first-team appearance for the club, those players are listed here.

Wellington's record appearance-maker is Andrew Durante, who has made a total of 281 appearances over 11 years at the club. Durante also holds the record for most starts, having started in 279 games. Roy Krishna is the club's top goalscorer, with 52 goals in his six seasons at the club. Twelve other players have made more than 100 appearances for the club.

List of players
Statistics correct as of end of the 2019–20 season

 Appearances and goals are for first-team competitive matches only, including A-League, FFA Cup and A-League Pre-Season Challenge Cup matches.
 Players are listed by number of appearances.

Notes
 A utility player is one who is considered to play in more than one position.

References

External links
 Wellington Phoenix official website
 Ultimate A-league player list

 
Wellington Phoenix FC
Association football player non-biographical articles